Wallace I. Matson (1921-2012) was an American philosopher and a professor of philosophy at the University of California, Berkeley. He is known for his works on the existence of God.

Biography
Matson was Professor of Philosophy at University of California, Berkeley (1955-1991) and Assistant Professor of Philosophy at University of Washington 1950–1955. Matson was an atheist. In 1978, he debated Thomas B. Warren on the existence of God.

Books

 The Existence of God (1965)
 Sentience (1976)
 A History of Philosophy (1968), revised and published in 2 volumes as A New History of Philosophy (1987), and revised again (2000)
 The Warren-Matson Debate on the Existence of God (1978)
 Uncorrected Papers (2006)
 Grand Theories and Everyday Beliefs: Science, Philosophy, and Their Histories, Oxford University Press, 2011

References

1921 births
2012 deaths
20th-century American philosophers
Atheist philosophers
Philosophy academics
University of California, Berkeley faculty
Place of birth missing
Place of death missing